Jan Olof "Janne" Andersson (born 29 September 1962) is a Swedish football coach who manages the Sweden national team. He is also a former player, with his playing career lasting 14 years between 1979 and 1993 playing for different Swedish clubs.

Playing career 
Andersson spent the majority of his playing career with Alets IK, but also briefly represented IS Halma and Laholms FK. A prolific goalscorer, he is Alet IK's all-time highest goalscorer and scored five goals in his last-ever appearance for the club.

Managerial career

Early career
During Andersson's early managerial years, he managed Alets IK and Laholms FK.

Halmstad
While at Halmstads BK, Andersson's team knocked out Portuguese giants Sporting Lisbon in the UEFA Cup, who had made it all the way to the UEFA cup final the previous year.

Örgryte
He took over Superettan team Örgryte IS in December 2009, who had just been relegated from Allsvenskan. During Andersson's stay at the club, Örgryte suffered from serious financial problems which eventually led their Superettan licence to be revoked. Andersson left the club after only one season.

IFK Norrköping
In 2011, Andersson was appointed as the manager for IFK Norrköping who were making their comeback in Allsvenskan after two seasons in Superettan. In 2015, he led Norrköping to win the league for the first time in 26 years after defeating defending champions Malmö FF away in the last game.

Sweden 
Following Sweden's disappointing Euro 2016 display, Andersson took over as the head coach of the Sweden national team after almost seven years of Erik Hamrén being in charge.

2018 World Cup
Under Andersson, Sweden qualified for its first FIFA World Cup in 12 years by eliminating the Netherlands and Italy during the qualification process. While at the 2018 World Cup, Sweden experienced its most successful World Cup campaign since 1994, winning Group F ahead of South Korea, Mexico, and reigning world champions Germany. Sweden eliminated Switzerland in the second round before losing to England in the quarter final.

2018–19 UEFA Nations League
During the 2018–19 UEFA Nations League campaign, Andersson and Sweden finished first in their UEFA Nations League B group ahead of Russia and Turkey, winning promotion to League A.

UEFA Euro 2020
Under Andersson, Sweden qualified for its sixth consecutive UEFA European Championship by finishing second behind Spain in UEFA Euro 2020 qualifying Group F. Andersson would then lead Sweden to the top of UEFA Euro 2020 Group E undefeated after a 0–0 draw against Spain, a 1–0 win over Slovakia and a 3–2 win against Poland. The last of which included a 90th-minute winner from Viktor Claesson. Andersson's side lost in the Round of 16 following a 120th minute extra time-winner from Ukraine.

Accolades
In July 2016, Andersson was named the 47th best manager in the world by football magazine FourFourTwo. In November 2018, Andersson was named by FourFourTwo as the 17th best manager in the world.

At the 2019 Swedish Sports Awards, Andersson was named Coach of the year.

Personal life
One of his role models is former Swedish handball coach Bengt Johansson, who is from the same neighbourhood (Söndrum) in Halmstad. Johansson served as Andersson's physical education teacher in primary school.

Managerial statistics

Honours
IFK Norrköping
Allsvenskan: 2015
Individual
 Allsvenskan Coach of the year: 2015
 Idrottsgalan Coach of the year: 2019

References

Living people
1962 births
Sportspeople from Halmstad
Association football forwards
Swedish footballers
IS Halmia players
Swedish football managers
Halmstads BK managers
Örgryte IS managers
IFK Norrköping managers
Sweden national football team managers
2018 FIFA World Cup managers
UEFA Euro 2020 managers
Sportspeople from Halland County